Fredrik Styrman (born April 3, 1991) is a Swedish former professional ice hockey player. He last played with Luleå HF in Swedish Hockey League (SHL).

On 30 August 2022, he announced his retirement from ice hockey, following Djurgårdens IF's Peter Holland during an SHL game between the two temas at Hovet in Stockholm on 14 October 2021 ripping off Peter Styrman's helmet, followed up with hitting him in the head.

Career statistics

Regular season and playoffs

International

References

External links

1991 births
Asplöven HC players
Brynäs IF players
Frölunda HC players
HV71 players
IK Oskarshamn players
Living people
Luleå HF players
Modo Hockey players
Skellefteå AIK players
Swedish ice hockey defencemen